Aethwy was a rural district in the administrative county of Anglesey, Wales, from 1894 to 1974.

It was created under the Local Government Act 1894 from the part of the Bangor rural sanitary district which was on Anglesey.

In 1933 it was expanded by a county review order, taking in all of the abolished Dwyran Rural District.

The district was abolished under the Local Government Act 1972, becoming part of a single Ynys Môn - Isle of Anglesey district.

Civil parishes
Over its existence the rural district contained the following civil parishes:

†In Dwyran RD until 1933.

References
https://web.archive.org/web/20071001030241/http://www.visionofbritain.org.uk/relationships.jsp?u_id=10114081&c_id=10001043

Rural districts of Wales
History of Anglesey
1894 establishments in Wales